Beata Iwanek (born 19 February 1964) is a Polish archer. She competed in the women's individual and team events at the 1988 Summer Olympics.

References

1964 births
Living people
Polish female archers
Olympic archers of Poland
Archers at the 1988 Summer Olympics
People from Kołobrzeg County